The Common Public Radio Interface (CPRI) standard defines an interface between Radio Equipment Control (REC) and Radio Equipment (RE). Oftentimes, CPRI links are used to carry data between cell sites and base stations.

The purpose of CPRI is to allow replacement of a copper or coax cable connection between a radio transceiver (used example for mobile-telephone communication and typically located in a tower) and a base station (typically located at the ground nearby), so the connection can be made to a remote and more convenient location. This connection (often referred to as the Fronthaul network) can be a fiber to an installation where multiple remote base stations may be served. This fiber supports both single and multi mode communication. The fiber end is connected with the transceiver device called Small form-factor pluggable transceiver.

The companies working to define the specification include Ericsson
AB, Huawei Technologies Co. Ltd, NEC Corporation and Nokia.

See also
 OBSAI
 Remote Radio Head

References

External links
 CPRI Homepage
 CPRI specification (free) at CPRI homepage

Radio technology